Kore Tola Nagaho (born 16 January 1997) is an Ethiopian middle-distance runner. She competed in the women's 800 metres at the 2017 World Championships in Athletics.

References

External links

1997 births
Living people
Ethiopian female middle-distance runners
World Athletics Championships athletes for Ethiopia
Place of birth missing (living people)
21st-century Ethiopian women